The 521st Air Defense Group is a disbanded United States Air Force organization. Its last assignment was with the 31st Air Division at Sioux City Municipal Airport, Iowa, where it was inactivated in 1955.  The group was originally activated as a support unit for the 310th Bombardment Group at the end of World War II in Italy and then redeployed to the United States where it was inactivated in 1945.

The group was activated once again in 1953, when ADC established it as the headquarters for a dispersed fighter-interceptor squadron and the medical, maintenance, and administrative squadrons supporting it.  It was replaced in 1955 when ADC transferred its mission, equipment, and personnel to the 53d Fighter Group in a project that replaced air defense groups commanding fighter squadrons with fighter groups with distinguished records during World War II.

World War II
The group was first activated as the 521st Air Service Group in a reorganization of Army Air Forces (AAF) support groups in which the AAF replaced Service Groups that included personnel from other branches of the Army and supported two combat groups with Air Service Groups including only Air Corps units.  It was designed to support a single combat group. Its 947th Air Engineering Squadron provided maintenance that was beyond the capability of the combat group, its 771st Air Materiel Squadron handled all supply matters, and its Headquarters & Base Services Squadron provided other support. The group supported 310th Bombardment Group in Italy. The group returned to the US in 1945 and was inactivated.  It was disbanded in 1948.

Cold War 

The group was reconstituted, redesignated as the 521st Air Defense Group, and activated at Sioux City Municipal Airport in 1953 with responsibility for air defense of central Midwestern United States.  It was assigned the 87th Fighter-Interceptor Squadron (FIS), which was already stationed at Sioux City Airport, and flying World War II era North American F-51 Mustangs as its operational component. The 87th FIS had been assigned directly to the 31st Air Division. The group replaced 79th Air Base Squadron as the host USAF unit at Sioux City Municipal Airport. It was assigned three squadrons to perform its support responsibilities.

In the fall of 1953 the 87th FIS upgraded to radar equipped and Mighty Mouse rocket armed North American F-86 Sabre jet aircraft and the 14th FIS, also flying "Sabres", was activated as the group's second operational squadron. In November 1954 the 87th FIS moved to England and was reassigned. The 87th FIS was replaced the next month by the 519th FIS, another "Sabre" squadron. The group was inactivated and replaced by the 53d Fighter Group (Air Defense) in 1955 as part of Air Defense Command's Project Arrow, which was designed to bring back on the active list the fighter units which had compiled memorable records in the two world wars. Disbanded once again in 1984.

Lineage
 Constituted as 521st Air Service Group
 Activated on 1 January 1945
 Inactivated on or about 7 November 1945
 Disbanded on 8 October 1948
 Reconstituted and redesignated as 521st Air Defense Group on 21 January 1953
 Activated on 16 February 1953
 Inactivated on 18 August 1955
 Disbanded on 27 September 1984

Assignments 
 XII Air Force Service Command, 1 January 1945
 Unknown, c.. 17 July 1945 – 7 November 1945
 31st Air Division, 1 January 1953 – 18 August 1955

Stations 
 Ghisonaccia Airfield, Corsica, France, 1 January 1945 – 7 April 1945
 Fano Airfield, Italy 7 April 1945 – c.. 6 July 1945
 Naples, Italy, c.. 6 July 1945 – c.. 17 July 1945
 Camp Patrick Henry, Virginia, c. 26 Jul 1945 -c.. 30 July 1945
 Unknown, July 1945–7 Nov 1945
 Sioux City Municipal Airport, Iowa, 1 January 1953 – 18 August 1955

Components 

Operational Squadrons
 14th Fighter-Interceptor Squadron, 18 November 1953 – 18 August 1955
 87th Fighter-Interceptor Squadron, 16 February 1953 – 21 December 1954
 519th Fighter-Interceptor Squadron, 8 December 1954 – 18 August 1955

Support Units
 521st Air Base Squadron, 16 February 1953 – 18 August 1955
 521st Materiel Squadron, 16 February 1953 – 18 August 1955
 521st Medical Squadron (later 521st USAF Infirmary), 16 February 1953 – 18 August 1955
 771st Air Materiel Squadron, 1 January 1945 – 1945
 947th Air Engineering Squadron, 1 January 1945 – 1945

Aircraft 
 North American F-51D Mustang, 1953
 North American F-86D Sabre, 1953–1955

See also
 List of United States Air Force Aerospace Defense Command Interceptor Squadrons
 List of F-86 Sabre units

Notes

References 

 Buss, Lydus H.(ed), Sturm, Thomas A., Volan, Denys, and McMullen, Richard F., History of Continental Air Defense Command and Air Defense Command July to December 1955, Directorate of Historical Services, Air Defense Command, Ent AFB, CO, (1956)

Further reading
 Grant, C.L., (1961)  The Development of Continental Air Defense to 1 September 1954, USAF Historical Study No. 126

External links

0521
Aerospace Defense Command units
Military units and formations established in 1953
Military units and formations disestablished in 1955